SPhos is a phosphine ligand derived from biphenyl. Its palladium complexes exhibit high activity for Suzuki coupling reactions involving aryl chlorides, which are unreactive with palladium complexes of most other phosphine ligands. The ligand has convenient handling characteristics since it is air-stable.

See also
 XPhos
 CPhos
 Suzuki reaction

References

Tertiary phosphines